William H. Moore may refer to:
William Henry Moore (judge) (1848–1923), American judge, attorney and financier
William Henry Moore (1872–1960), Canadian lawyer, author and member of the Canadian House of Commons
William Henry Moore (Australian solicitor) (1788–1854), English-Australian solicitor
Henson Moore (William Henson Moore III, born 1939), former member of the U.S. House of Representatives

See also 
 William Moore (disambiguation)